The flathead catshark (Apristurus macrorhynchus) is a catshark of the family Scyliorhinidae in the order Carcharhiniformes, found in the deep waters of the northwest Pacific Ocean.

References

 

flathead catshark
Marine fauna of East Asia
Taxa named by Shigeho Tanaka
flathead catshark